The Estadio Alfredo Díaz Angulo is a multi-use stadium in Guamúchil, Sinaloa, Mexico.  It is currently used mostly for football matches and is the home stadium for Murciélagos F.C. B.  The stadium has a capacity of 5,000 people.

References

External links

Sport in Sinaloa
Football venues in Mexico